Acrocercops cyanodeta is a moth of the family Gracillariidae, known from Karnataka, India. It was described by Edward Meyrick in 1918.

References

cyanodeta
Moths of Asia
Moths described in 1918